SMS V6 was a V1-class torpedo boat of the Imperial German Navy. The ship was built by AG Vulcan, completing in 1913. She served in the First World War with the German High Seas Fleet, taking part in the Battle of Jutland. After the war, she served with the Weimar Republic's Reichsmarine until stricken in 1929 and was subsequently broken up.

Construction and design
In 1911, the Imperial German Navy placed orders for a flotilla of 12 torpedo boats as part of its shipbuilding programme for that year, with one half flotilla of six ordered from AG Vulcan, and six from Germaniawerft. The 1911 torpedo boats were smaller than those ordered in recent years in order to be more manoeuvrable and so work better with the fleet, which resulted in the numbering series for torpedo boats being restarted. The reduction in size resulted in the ships' seaworthiness being adversely affected, with the 1911 torpedo boats and the similar craft of the 1912 programme acquiring the disparaging nickname "Admiral Lans' cripples".

Two replacement ships were ordered for the German navy, sharing the same names as the two sold ships. The new V6, yard number 320, was launched from Vulcan's Stettin, Prussia (now Szczecin in Poland) shipyard on 28 February 1913 and commissioned on 17 May that year.

Armament consisted of two  SK L/30 naval guns in single mounts fore and aft, together with four 50 cm (19.7 in) torpedo tubes with one reload torpedo carried. Up to 18 mines could be carried. In 1916 the L/30 guns were replaced by more powerful  SK L/45 guns. In 1921 she was rearmed with two 10.5 cm SK L/45 naval guns and two 50 cm torpedo tubes, and was fitted with new boilers. The ship had a crew of 74 officers and other ranks.

Service
On commissioning, V6 joined the 9th Half-flotilla of the 5th Torpedo Boat Flotilla, serving as the leader of the half-flotilla.

First World War
On the outbreak of the First World War, V6 was part of the 9th Half-Flotilla of the 5th Torpedo Boat Flotilla. On 28 August 1914, a British force of destroyers and cruisers supported by battlecruisers made a sortie into the Heligoland Bight in order to ambush German torpedo boats on patrol, which caused the Battle of Heligoland Bight. The 5th Torpedo Boat Flotilla, including V6, were sent out from Heligoland to investigate sightings of British submarines (which were deployed as bait to draw out German ships), and ran into several British destroyers. The Flotilla then turned away to try and escape the trap, but the torpedo boat , which along with  could not make full speed and lagged behind the rest of the flotilla, was hit by British shells before the arrival of the German cruiser  allowed the 5th Flotilla to escape. In total, however, three German light cruisers (and ) and one torpedo boat of the German outer screen had been sunk. On 2 November 1914, German battlecruisers and light cruisers, with an escort of torpedo boats of the 3rd, 5th, 6th, 7th and 8th Torpedo Boat Flotillas left port to shell Great Yarmouth and lay mines off the British East Coast, with V6 part if the 5th Flotilla. Yarmouth was attacked on 3 November, with little damage being done.

On 7–8 September 1915, the 5th and 9th Torpedo Boat Flotillas carried out a reconnaissance sweep in the German Bight, with V6 leading the 9th Half-Flotilla. V6 and  assisted when the torpedo boat  took V1 under tow.

At the Battle of Jutland on 31 May–1 June 1916, V6 was part of the 9th Half-Flotilla, 5th Torpedo Boat Flotilla, operating in support of the main German battle fleet. From about 20:15 CET (19:15 GMT), the German torpedo boat flotillas launched a series of torpedo attacks against the British battle line in order to cover the German fleet's turn away from the British. First to attack were the 6th and 9th Flotillas, followed by the 3rd Flotilla. At 20:38, the 5th Flotilla started an attack run, but it was unable to find the British battle-line due to poor visibility caused by fog and smoke, and the attack was aborted. During the night action, the 5th Flotilla was ordered to search for and attack the British fleet, but failed to encounter the British battleships. After V6 and V2 rescued the survivors from V4, V6 scuttled V4 with shellfire and a torpedo.

By late April 1917, the torpedo boats of the 5th Torpedo Boat Flotilla had been fitted for minesweeping and their crews trained in that task, and became increasingly dedicated to minesweeping. V6 remained part of the 9th Half-Flotilla of the 5th Torpedo Boat Flotilla at the end of the War in November 1918.

Postwar operations
V6 survived the war, and was one of the twelve destroyers that the Reichsmarine was allowed to retain under the Treaty of Versailles.  In early 1923 V6 was serving in the North Sea. By 1929, the Reichsmarine had taken delivery of twelve Type 24 and Type 25 torpedo boats, and therefore disposed of the least useful of its old torpedo boats in order to keep within Treaty limits. She was stricken on 27 March 1929 and was broken up at Wilhelmshaven.

Notes

References

Bibliography

 

 
 
 

Torpedo boats of the Imperial German Navy
Ships built in Stettin
1911 ships
World War I torpedo boats of Germany
V1-class destroyers